Gonaepa dysthyma is a moth in the family Gelechiidae. It was described by Alexey Diakonoff in 1954. It is found in New Guinea.

References

Gelechiinae
Moths described in 1954